Ose may refer to:
 Ose (demon)
 Ose (Osei Kofi Tutu I), King of the Ashanti Empire
 Ōse, Ehime, a former village in Japan
 Ose, Nigeria, a Local Government Area of Ondo State
 Ose, Norway, a location in Setesdal
 Ose, Poland
 Ose, Skye, a settlement in Scotland
 -ose, a suffix used in chemistry to indicate a sugar
 Ose (band), a French progressive rock band

OSE may stand for:
 Obras Sanitarias del Estado, a state-owned Uruguayan water utilities company
 Hellenic Railways Organisation, the Greek national railway company 
 Œuvre de secours aux enfants, a French Jewish humanitarian organization, founded in Russia in 1912, active in Western Europe during World War II
 Office Server Extensions for Microsoft Servers
 Old St. Edwardian, a person who attended St Edward's School, Oxford
 OMA Service Environment
 Open Source Ecology, A Group Dedicated to the Collaborative Development of Open Source Hardware (And tools/workflows to enable this)
 OPENSTEP Enterprise, NeXT's offering of the OpenStep platform for Microsoft Windows
 Open System Environment, a reference model for Enterprise Architecture 
 Operating System Embedded, a real-time operating system created by ENEA
 Order of Saint Elisabeth  	
 Order of the Star in the East
 Organismós Sidirodrómon Elládos, Hellenic Railways Organisation, the state-owned railway company of Greece
 :es:Orquesta Sinfónica de Euskadi, Basque National Orchestra
 Osaka Securities Exchange
 Oslo Stock Exchange

Öse may refer to:
 Öse, a river of North Rhine-Westphalia, Germany, tributary of the Nethe